Todd Gray FRHistS, MBE (born 1958) is a historian of the county of Devon, England.

Gray was born and raised in New England, USA and first visited Devon on a school trip in 1973. He undertook a degree in London and then started studying for a PhD at the University of Exeter in 1984. He completed his doctorate in 1988 and has since then been a research fellow at the university. In 1992 he became a Fellow of the Royal Historical Society.

Gray became a British citizen in 2006 and in 2014 he was awarded an MBE for voluntary services to Devon's history. He has been involved on the committees of many local organisations including Devon & Cornwall Notes & Queries (committee), the Devonshire Association (chairman and president), Devon History Society (committee), The Devon and Cornwall Record Society (chairman), Devon Gardens Trust, Devon Family History Society (president), the Centre for South-Western Historical Studies and the Friends of Devon's Archives (chairman).

In 2006, based on a 16th-century document, Gray claimed that the Cornish pasty was in fact invented in Devon as early as 1460 which not only caused consternation in Cornwall, but was remarked upon as far away as China.

 Gray had published 48 books, 14 of which are about Exeter. Many of the books have been published through his own company, Mint Press. In November 2018 he was awarded the Honorary Freedom of the City of Exeter at a ceremony in the city's Guildhall.

References

Historians of Devon
Living people
Fellows of the Royal Historical Society
1958 births